The 1928–29 Ljubljana Subassociation League was the tenth season of the Ljubljana Subassociation League. Primorje defended the title after defeating I. SSK Maribor with 12–7 on aggregate in the final.

Celje subdivision

Ljubljana subdivision

Maribor subdivision

Semi-final

Final

References

External links
Football Association of Slovenia 

Slovenian Republic Football League seasons
Yugo
2
Football
Football